Dwight Live is the first live album by country music artist Dwight Yoakam. It was released in 1995 on Reprise Records. Recorded at The Warfield in San Francisco, California in 1994 on his This Time Tour, this album comprises live renditions of seventeen of his songs.

Track listing 
"Little Sister" (Doc Pomus, Mort Shuman) – 3:52
"It Only Hurts When I Cry" (Roger Miller, Dwight Yoakam) – 2:30
"The Heart That You Own" (Yoakam) – 4:04
"This Time" (Yoakam, Kostas) – 3:51
"Streets of Bakersfield" (Homer Joy) – 2:47
"Little Ways" (Yoakam) – 3:25
"Please, Please Baby" (Yoakam) – 4:05
"Nothing's Changed Here" (Yoakam, Kostas) – 3:09
"Lonesome Roads" (Yoakam) – 3:22
"A Thousand Miles from Nowhere" (Yoakam) – 4:20
"Wild Ride" (Yoakam) – 4:43
"Two Doors Down" (Yoakam, Kostas) – 3:58
"Fast as You" (Yoakam) – 4:19
"Long White Cadillac" (Dave Alvin) – 6:47
"Miner's Prayer" (Yoakam) – 2:25
"Rocky Road Blues" (Bill Monroe) – 6:44
"Suspicious Minds" (Mark James) – 7:25

Personnel
 Beth Anderson - background vocals
 Pete Anderson - electric guitar
 Jim Christie - drums
 Skip Edwards - keyboards
 Tommy Funderburk - background vocals
 Scott Joss - fiddle, mandolin
 Taras Prodaniuk - bass guitar
 Dwight Yoakam - acoustic guitar, electric guitar, lead vocals

Charts

Weekly charts

Year-end charts

References

Dwight Yoakam albums
Albums produced by Pete Anderson
1995 live albums
Reprise Records live albums